Lissotrachelus is an Asian genus of crickets, typical of the tribe Lissotrachelini; species records range from southern China, Indo-China to Borneo.

Species 
The Orthoptera Species File lists:
Lissotrachelus ater Brunner von Wattenwyl, 1893
Lissotrachelus castaneus Brunner von Wattenwyl, 1893
Lissotrachelus ferrugineonotatus Brunner von Wattenwyl, 1893 - type species (as L. ferrugineo-notatus)

References

External links
 

Ensifera genera
crickets
Orthoptera of Asia